Yong Jae-hyun  (born 19 July 1988) is a South Korean footballer who plays for FC Anyang in the K League Challenge. He is a versatile player, capable of playing at left back, right back, or defensive midfield. In 2015, he changed his name from Yong Hyun-jin (용현진) to Yong Jae-hyun.

External links 

1988 births
Living people
Association football fullbacks
South Korean footballers
Seongnam FC players
Gimcheon Sangmu FC players
Incheon United FC players
Busan IPark players
FC Anyang players
K League 1 players
K League 2 players